Gillian McCord is a Scottish former rugby union player who played lock for Royal High Corstorphine RFC and Watsonians Ladies Rugby at a club level, and the Scotland women's national rugby union team. She made her debut as Scottish Captain against Canada in 2007. In 2019, she placed as a runner-up in the cooking competition show MasterChef.

Playing career
During her rugby union playing career, Jilly McCord played as a lock. She initially played for Watsonians Ladies Rugby at club level.

In 2002, McCord was told that she would be unable to play for the Scotland women's national rugby union team unless she improved her pace by losing weight. Following her weight loss, she was selected for the national team. In 2007, she was named as Scottish captain, taking over from Donna Kennedy. Her first match as captain was against Canada, where she earned her 28th cap. She competed at the 2010 Women's Rugby World Cup.

MasterChef
In 2019, she competed in the cooking television series MasterChef, where she reached the final, losing to Irini Tzortzoglou.

Personal life
McCord lived in Inverkeithing, Fife, before moving to Cramond, Edinburgh, with her partner Kimberley Fergus and her two dachshunds. She works as a history teacher at Dollar Academy, a boarding school in Dollar, Clackmannanshire.

References

Living people
20th-century Scottish women
21st-century Scottish women
Female rugby union players
Lesbian sportswomen
LGBT rugby union players
Scottish lesbians
Scottish LGBT sportspeople
Scotland women's international rugby union players
Scottish female rugby union players
Year of birth missing (living people)